Paula Elizabeth Yates (24 April 1959 – 17 September 2000) was a British television presenter and writer. Yates is best known for her work on two television programmes, The Tube and The Big Breakfast. She was subjected to intense media attention and scrutiny, owing to her popularity and her relationships with musicians Bob Geldof and Michael Hutchence.

Early life
Born on 24 April 1959 in Colwyn Bay, Wales, to English parents, Yates was brought up in a show business family. Her mother was Elaine Smith, a former showgirl, actress, and writer of erotic novels from Blackpool, who used the stage name Heller Toren. Up until 1997, Yates believed her biological father to be Jess Yates, who hosted the ITV religious programme Stars on Sunday. A DNA test in that year revealed that her biological father was game show host Hughie Green. Jess Yates and Elaine Smith were married from 1958 to 1975. Jess Yates was 19 years older than his wife, and their marriage was unconventional.

Yates described her childhood as lonely and isolated; her mother, she claimed, was absent for much of her upbringing. She attended a village primary school, Penrhos College, and Ysgol Aberconwy. The Yates family ran the Deganwy Castle Hotel for a time, before moving to a house near Conwy. After the break-up of her parents' marriage in 1975, Yates lived mostly with her mother despite having a closer relationship with her father, and also had periods in Malta and Mallorca where she was a pupil at Bellver International College, before returning to Britain.

Career
In 1979, Yates began her career as a music journalist with a column called "Natural Blonde" in the Record Mirror, shortly after posing for Penthouse magazine. She first came to prominence in the 1980s, as co-presenter (with Jools Holland) of the Channel 4 pop music programme The Tube, having been a minor co-host of BBC TV chat shows with presenter Terry Wogan. She also appeared alongside her friend Jennifer Saunders in 1987 for a spoof documentary on pop group Bananarama.

In 1982, she released a version of the Nancy Sinatra hit song, "These Boots Are Made for Walkin'". 

After the birth of her daughters, Yates wrote two books on motherhood. She continued with her rock journalism, in addition to being presenter of the cutting-edge music show The Tube. 

Yates became most notorious for her "on the bed" interviews on the show The Big Breakfast, produced by her husband, Bob Geldof. She casually asked the questions she felt people really wanted the answers to: "Is it true you had an affair with Prince?" (to Kylie Minogue) — and persuaded Sting to take his trousers off live on air.

At the time of her death in 2000, Yates was working on a book titled Sex and Death, writing about her life from the moment she visited Hutchence's body in the morgue.

Personal life
Yates met Geldof in the early days of the Boomtown Rats. They began a romantic relationship in 1976 when she flew to Paris to surprise him while the band was playing there. Their first daughter, Fifi, was born in 1983. After ten years together, Yates and Geldof married on 31 August 1986 in Las Vegas, with Simon Le Bon of Duran Duran acting as best man. The couple then had two more daughters, Peaches on 13 March 1989, and Pixie on 17 September 1990.

Whilst married to Geldof, Yates had a year-long affair with American singer Terrence Trent D'Arby. She had a six-year long affair with actor Rupert Everett.

In 1985, Yates met INXS lead singer Michael Hutchence while interviewing him for Channel 4's rock magazine programme The Tube. During this appearance on The Tube, Yates was reportedly asked to leave Hutchence alone by the road manager of INXS when she walked up to him and said, "I'm going to have that boy [Hutchence]". Yates was unmoved by the manager's request and began to show up at INXS gigs everywhere for the next few years, even taking her young daughter Fifi along. Yates maintained irregular contact with Hutchence during the intervening nine years and their affair had been under way for some months before their Big Breakfast interview in October 1994. In February 1995, Yates left Geldof, and later that year became pregnant with Hutchence's child.

Geldof and Yates divorced in May 1996. On 22 July 1996, Yates gave birth to a daughter, Tiger Lily.

On 22 November 1997, Hutchence was found dead in a hotel room in Sydney. The official verdict into his death said that he committed suicide by hanging. Yates wrote in her police statement that Hutchence was "frightened and couldn't stand a minute more without his baby". During their phone conversations on the morning of his suicide, he had said, "I don't know how I'll live without Tiger". Yates also wrote that Geldof had threatened them repeatedly, saying: "Don't forget, I am above the law." Yates became distraught, refusing to accept the coroner's verdict of suicide and insisting that it was a case of auto-erotic asphyxiation. She eventually sought psychiatric treatment.

In December 1997, a few weeks after Hutchence's death and while Yates was fighting for custody of her daughter with Hutchence, Yates suffered another blow when a DNA test result confirmed tabloid media reports that Jess Yates, who had died in April 1993, was not her biological father. A paternity test proved that the talent show host Hughie Green, who had died six months before Hutchence, was her biological father.

In June 1998, Geldof won full custody of the couple's three daughters after Yates attempted suicide. She met Kingsley O'Keke during her stay in treatment, but the pair broke up after a six-week romance. O'Keke later sold his story to a tabloid newspaper.

Death
On 17 September 2000, on Pixie's 10th birthday, Yates died at her home in Notting Hill at the age of 41 of a heroin overdose. The coroner ruled that it was not a suicide, but a result of "foolish and incautious" behaviour. Yates was discovered in the presence of her then-four-year-old daughter, Tiger Lily. A friend disclosed during the inquest that Yates had not taken illegal drugs for nearly two years, and the coroner, Paul Knapman, concluded that although the amount Yates had taken would not have killed an addict, "an unsophisticated taker of heroin" like Yates had no tolerance to the drug.

Soon after Yates's death, Geldof assumed foster custody of Tiger Lily so that she could be brought up with her three older half-sisters, Fifi, Peaches and Pixie. Her aunt, Tina Hutchence, the sister of Michael Hutchence, was denied permission by the judge to apply for Tiger Lily to live with her in California. In 2007, Geldof adopted Tiger Lily and changed her surname to Geldof; as of 2019, Tiger's legal name was Heavenly Hiraani Tiger Lily Hutchence Geldof.

On 7 April 2014, Yates's second-oldest daughter, Peaches, also died of a heroin overdose, aged 25. One day before her death, she uploaded a picture to her Instagram of herself as a young girl and her mother under the caption "Me and my Mum."

Legacy
On 13 March 2023, Yates was the subject of a two-part Channel 4 documentary, which looked at her life and career. The documentary, highlighted the intense media surrounding Yates and the often negative coverage in the British press. Paula included interviews with her friends and social commentators including best friend Belinda Bewin, Nicky Clarke, Robbie Williams and Grace Dent, and used archive footage of Yates and previously unheard recorded interviews, conducted shortly after the death of Hutchence. Bewin revealed that she and Yates had been shopping on the Fulham Road in London, when they met Diana, Princess of Wales, who told Yates: "I love it when you're on the front page of the papers, because it means I got the day off".

In a review for Paula, Lucy Mangan, writing for The Guardian, hailed the documentary as "a glorious celebration of the most witty, flirty woman to ever grace our TVs" and gave the show 4/5 stars.  Carol Midgeley, writing for The Times, also gave the documentary 4/5 stars, opining that Yates was a "fizzling force of nature".

Filmography

Selected credits

Bibliography 
Yates was the author of several books, including:
Rock Stars in Their Underpants (1980) 
A Tail of Two Kitties (1983)
Blondes (1983)
Sex with Paula Yates (1986)
The Fun Starts Here (1990)
The Fun Don't Stop: Loads of Rip-roaring Activities for You and Your Toddler (1991)
And the Fun Goes On: A Practical Guide to Playing and Learning with Your Pre-school Child (1991)
Village People (1993)
The Autobiography (1995)
Sex & Death (2000 Unpublished)

References

Works cited

External links
National Portrait Gallery holdings with sitter Paula Yates

1959 births
2000 deaths
Accidental deaths in London
Deaths by heroin overdose in England
People educated at Rydal Penrhos
People from Colwyn Bay
English people of Scottish descent
English television presenters
English women writers
People educated at Ysgol Aberconwy
20th-century Welsh women writers
20th-century Welsh writers